Henry Stephenson (1871–1956) was a British film and stage actor.

Henry Stephenson may also refer to:

 Henry Stephenson (Australian politician) (1862–1930)
 Henry Frederick Stephenson (1842–1919), Royal Navy officer
 Sir Henry Stephenson, 1st Baronet (1865–1947), British politician
 Henry Palfrey Stephenson (1826–1890), Scottish-born civil engineer
 Henry Spencer Stephenson (1871–1957), British minister
 Henry Thew Stephenson (1870–1957), teacher and writer